Stjerneborg ("Star Castle" in English) was Tycho Brahe's underground observatory next to his palace-observatory Uraniborg, located on the island of Hven in  the Øresund between Denmark and Sweden.

Tycho Brahe built it circa 1581. He wrote: "My purpose was partly to have placed some of the most important instruments securely and firmly in order that they should not be exposed to the disturbing influence of the wind, and should be easier to use, partly to separate my collaborators when there were several with me at the same time, and have some of them make observations in the castle itself, others in these cellars, in order that they should not get in the way of each other or compare their observations before I wanted this." He named it Stiernburg in vernacular or Stellæburgus in Latin. Both the Danish and Latin names mean "castle of the stars".

The underground portions of the observatory were excavated in the 1950s and are today fitted with a roof approximating the original one. The chambers now house a multimedia show open to the public.

See also
 List of astronomical observatories

References 
 

Landskrona Municipality
Buildings and structures completed in 1581
Astronomical observatories in Denmark
Architecture in Denmark
Buildings and structures in Skåne County
1581 establishments in Denmark
16th-century establishments in Skåne County